Machalek is a surname, a variant of Michálek. Notable people with the surname include:

 Richard Machalek (born 1946), American sociologist
 Miloslav Machálek (born 1961), Czech football manager
 Marzena Machałek (born 1960), Polish politician